Martin Davis may refer to:

 Martin Davis (Australian footballer) (born 1936), Australian rules footballer
 Martin Davis (Jamaican footballer) (born 1996), Jamaican footballer
 Martin Davis (mathematician) (1928–2023), American mathematician
 Martin Davis (tennis) (born 1958), American former tennis player
 Martin Jay Davis (1937–2022), American astrologer, author and Olympic fencer
 Martin K. Davis (1843–1936), Union Army soldier during the American Civil War
 Martin S. Davis (1927–1999), Paramount Communications executive

See also
 Martin Davies (disambiguation)